The 1997 NCAA Division I men's ice hockey tournament involved 12 schools playing in single-elimination play to determine the national champion of men's  NCAA Division I college ice hockey. It began on March 21, 1997, and ended with the championship game on March 29. A total of 11 games were played.

Qualifying teams
The at-large bids and seeding for each team in the tournament were announced after the conference tournaments concluded. The Western Collegiate Hockey Association (WCHA) had four teams receive a berth in the tournament, Central Collegiate Hockey Association (CCHA) and the ECAC each had three teams receive a berth in the tournament, while Hockey East had two berths.

Game locations
 East Regional – Centrum Centre, Worcester, Massachusetts
 West Regional – Van Andel Arena, Grand Rapids, Michigan
 Frozen Four – Bradley Center, Milwaukee

Brackets

Regionals

Frozen Four

Note: * denotes overtime period(s)

Regional Quarterfinals

East Regional

(3) Vermont vs. (6) Denver

(4) New Hampshire vs. (5) Colorado College

West Regional

(3) Miami vs. (6) Cornell

(4) Minnesota vs. (5) Michigan State

Regional semifinals

East Regional

(1) Clarkson vs. (5) Colorado College

(2) Boston University vs. (6) Denver

West Regional

(1) Michigan vs. (4) Minnesota

(2) North Dakota vs. (6) Cornell

Frozen Four

National semifinal

(E5) Colorado College vs. (W2) North Dakota

(E2) Boston University vs. (W1) Michigan

National Championship

(W2) North Dakota vs. (E2) Boston University

All-Tournament team
G: Aaron Schweitzer (North Dakota)
D: Curtis Murphy (North Dakota)
D: Tom Poti (Boston University)
F: Chris Drury (Boston University)
F: Matt Henderson* (North Dakota)
F: David Hoogsteen (North Dakota)
* Most Outstanding Player(s)

Record by conference

References

Tournament
NCAA Division I men's ice hockey tournament
NCAA Men's Division Ice Hockey Tournament
NCAA Men's Division Ice Hockey Tournament
NCAA Men's Division Ice Hockey Tournament
NCAA Men's Division Ice Hockey Tournament
1990s in Milwaukee
History of Grand Rapids, Michigan
Ice hockey competitions in Worcester, Massachusetts
Ice hockey competitions in Michigan
Sports competitions in Milwaukee
Ice hockey competitions in Wisconsin
Sports in Grand Rapids, Michigan
College sports tournaments in Wisconsin